Richard Stanley Bartlewski Jr. (born August 15, 1967) is a former American professional football player who was a tight end in the National Football League (NFL) and the World League of American Football (WLAF). He played for the Los Angeles Raiders and Atlanta Falcons of the NFL, and the Montreal Machine of the WLAF. Bartlewski played collegiately at Fresno State.

References

1967 births
Living people
American football tight ends
Atlanta Falcons players
Fresno State Bulldogs football players
Los Angeles Raiders players
Montreal Machine players
People from Butler, Pennsylvania
Players of American football from Pennsylvania